The Swan River is a  tributary of the Mississippi River that flows through Todd and Morrison counties of the U.S. state of Minnesota.

Swan River is the English translation of the native Ojibwe language name given for two types of swans seen in the area: the trumpeter swan and the whistling swan.

See also
List of rivers of Minnesota
List of longest streams of Minnesota

References

External links
Minnesota Watersheds
USGS Hydrologic Unit Map - State of Minnesota (1974)

Rivers of Minnesota
Tributaries of the Mississippi River
Rivers of Todd County, Minnesota
Rivers of Morrison County, Minnesota